The discography of American alternative rock band Pearl Jam, consists of 11 studio albums, 15 live albums, three compilation albums, 36 singles, and numerous official bootlegs.

Pearl Jam was formed in 1990 by bassist Jeff Ament, guitarist Stone Gossard, and guitarist Mike McCready, who then recruited vocalist Eddie Vedder and drummer Dave Krusen. The band signed to Epic Records in 1991. A few months after the completion of the band's debut studio album, Ten, drummer Dave Abbruzzese joined the band. Ten broke Pearl Jam into the mainstream, and became one of the best-selling alternative albums of the 1990s. Following an intense touring schedule, the band went into the studio to record what would become its second studio album, Vs. Upon its release, Vs. set the record for most copies of an album sold in a week, and spent five weeks at the top of the Billboard 200. Burdened by the pressures of success, Pearl Jam decided to decrease the level of promotion for its albums, including refusing to release music videos. In 1994, the band released its third studio album, Vitalogy, which became the band's third straight album to reach multi-platinum status.

Following Abbruzzese's exit in 1994, original Red Hot Chili Peppers drummer Jack Irons joined the band. Pearl Jam subsequently released No Code in 1996 and Yield in 1998. The band once again changed drummers in 1998, with Irons being replaced by Soundgarden drummer Matt Cameron, who had previously worked with the members of Pearl Jam in the Temple of the Dog project and had drummed on the band's first demos. Cameron has remained as Pearl Jam's drummer ever since. In 1998, Pearl Jam released "Last Kiss" on the band's fan club Christmas single; however, by popular demand, the cover was released to the public as a single in 1999. "Last Kiss" became the band's highest-charting single, peaking at number two on the Billboard Hot 100. In 2000, Pearl Jam released its sixth studio album, Binaural, and initiated a series of "official bootlegs" of live albums. The band released 72 such live albums in 2000 and 2001, and set a record for most albums to debut in the Billboard 200 at the same time. The band's seventh studio album, 2002's Riot Act, was their last for Epic. After a one-record deal with J Records in 2006 for the distribution of their eighth studio album, the eponymous Pearl Jam, the band started releasing through self-owned label Monkeywrench Records, starting with their ninth studio album, Backspacer, in 2009. Since its inception, Pearl Jam has sold 33 million albums in the US, including all of the band's live official bootlegs, and over 100 million copies worldwide until 2017. Pearl Jam released their eleventh studio album, Gigaton, on Monkeywrench Records/ Republic Records on March 27, 2020, in the US. Internationally, the album was distributed by Universal Music Group International.

Albums

Studio albums

Live albums

Official bootlegs

In addition to the live albums such as Live on Two Legs, Live at Benaroya Hall, Live at the Gorge 05/06, Live on Ten Legs, Let's Play Two and myriad live versions of studio songs spread across singles as B-sides, the band has released an official bootlegs series of live recordings for each show of each tour since its 2000 European tour, with the exception of the 2004 Vote for Change tour and its 2007 European tour. The band has sold more than 3.5 million copies of shows from the launch of this series in 2000 through to their 2008 tour. For its 2000 and 2003 tours, the bootlegs consisted of double-disc (and sometimes triple-disc) albums. The bootleg series switched over to MP3 format for the band's 2005 shows and expanded to include lossless FLAC format for its 2006 tour. Official bootlegs are available for all of the band's tours since 2008 in FLAC, MP3, and CD formats.

Compilations

Singles

 "—" denotes singles that did not chart.
 I In the United States and Canada, the EP Merkin Ball charted as the single "I Got Id".

Promotional singles

Ten Club holiday singles

Every year since 1991 (with the exception of 1994), Pearl Jam has rewarded members of their official fan club (Ten Club) with exclusive, vinyl singles. The singles were initially mailed out during the holiday season. However, actual holiday season delivery of subsequent singles has become somewhat hit or miss throughout the years. Packaged alongside the yearly holiday singles, "Analog" members also receive a copy of the band's magazine, Deep. The majority of the tracks on the albums are either covers and/or live versions of songs. There are also many notable guest artists featured with Pearl Jam on many of the songs. The band announced on December 27, 2018, that the holiday singles would be discontinued after the 2017 and 2018 singles were released.

Videos

Music videos

 I Unreleased.

Other appearances

Notes

References

External links
 
 Ten Club at Discogs

Discographies of American artists
Discography
Rock music group discographies
Alternative rock discographies